Margielyn Arda Didal (born April 19, 1999) is a Filipino professional street skateboarder who rose to fame when she competed in the X Games Minneapolis 2018 and won a gold medal in the 2018 Asian Games.

Early life and family
Margielyn Didal was born on April 19, 1999 in Cebu City, Philippines to Lito and Julie Didal. Her father is a carpenter and her mother is a sidewalk vendor selling kwek kwek. She is the fourth of five siblings.

Career

Early years
Didal started skateboarding with friends at the now-closed Concave Park in Cebu. When the park closed, she and her friends struggled to find a new place to skateboard. She has narrated how she and her friends were apprehended by police officers and security guards when they were caught practicing in the streets and in abandoned areas, as well as one account of being barred entry from a shopping mall due to her having a skateboard. Didal's parents were initially skeptical of Didal pursuing a career in skateboarding but later supported her decision.

She approached Daniel Bautista, who would later be her coach in the 2018 Asian Games, and borrowed boards from Bautista's friends. Bautista said that Didal became better than boys in her area and he recognized her talent. In 2012, Didal started to compete in local tournaments in Cebu City, particularly those organized by Jeson L. Guardo of G-Concepts, in Barangay Tisa in Cebu City.

Sometime in 2014, she injured her right arm, and in December of the same year she severely sprained her right ankle, her dominant foot. The effect of the latter injury lingered for some years. To manage the ankle sprain, Didal underwent months of therapy at Cardia Olympia and intense assessment at the Red Bull High Performance Training Center in Santa Monica, California in July 2019.

Street League Skateboarding
Didal would later compete in tournaments abroad and secure sponsors. She became the first Filipino skateboarder to compete in Street League Skateboarding when she participated in the SLS PRO Open in London, England on May 26, 2018. In the preliminary round, she finished fourth and advanced to the final round to finish eighth overall.

Due to her performance in the SLS, a local wrote a letter to Cebu City Mayor Tommy Osmeña asking him to build a skate park in the city. Osmeña responded that if Cebu City won the 2018 Philippine National Games, half of the prize money would be allotted for a sports and skating park at the South Road Properties.

In the 2019 SLS World Championship in Rio de Janeiro, Brazil, Didal reached the semifinals, becoming the first representative of the Philippines to do so along with Christiana Means. Didal failed to advance to the finals, finishing 14th overall with 20 points.

X Games
Didal was invited to compete at the X Games, becoming the first competitor to formally represent the Philippines in the games. She participated in the 2018 X Games in Minneapolis, Minnesota in the United States.

Asian Games
Didal competed for the Philippines in the women's street skateboarding event. She trained for two months in the United States prior to the event. Didal won the fourth gold for the Philippines at the 2018 Asian Games. In seven attempts, Didal accumulated 30.4 points to win the gold while silver medalist Isa Kaya of Japan and bronze medalist Bunga Nyimas of Indonesia accumulated 25 and 19.8 points respectively. She scored 14.2 points in her first two runs and garnered the most points in the fourth run, scoring 8.9 points by performing the backside 50/50, 360-degree flip out for the first time in a major competition. She earned the most points in the women's street park event.

Following her achievement, she was named as the flag bearer of the Philippine delegation for the closing ceremony of the games.

Cebu City Mayor Tommy Osmeña reiterated earlier plans for his city saying that his sister has pledged a  donation to build a skate park at the South Road Properties. As of January 2020, talks regarding the possible construction of the skate park are still being held.

National Championship
Didal participated in the inaugural Philippine National Skateboarding Championship held in Santa Rosa, Laguna in July 2019, where she won the gold medal for the women's street event.

South East Asian Games
During the 2019 Southeast Asian Games, Didal won two gold medals in women's Game of Skate and street skateboarding.

2020 Tampa Pro Womens Open Finals
Didal finished 3rd at the 2020 Tampa Pro Women's Open Finals in Florida.

2020 Summer Olympics
Didal qualified for the 2020 Summer Olympics in Tokyo, where skateboarding made its Olympic debut. Competing in the women's street event, Didal advanced to the finals, placing 7th.

Didal had her own custom skate park built in Soul Sierra, Cebu City. It first opened in early 2021 and became the training venue of the Philippine national skateboarding team, including herself.

Other recognitions
Time magazine included Didal in its list of "25 Most Influential Teens of 2018," recognizing her feat in winning a gold medal in the 2018 Asian Games, which it said would "cement skateboarding's status as a serious sport" in the Philippines. Didal was also given the Asia Skater of the Year award for 2020.

Personal life
Didal is a member of the LGBT community, saying in an interview with ABS-CBN that her parents accept her identity. She has a girlfriend, named Jozel, with whom she has been in a relationship for eight years as of February 2023. On February 2023, the two got engaged. Aside from her coach, Bautista, Didal also looks up to Hong Kong national team coach Warren Stuart, who is also one of her sponsors, and Brian Siswojo of the 8Five2 skateshop as her inspiration in skateboarding.

In popular culture
Didal's life story was dramatized in an episode of Maalaala Mo Kaya, a drama anthology series, aired in 2018 on ABS-CBN. She was portrayed by Elisse Joson.

References

1999 births
Living people
Asian Games gold medalists for the Philippines
Asian Games medalists in skateboarding
Cebuano people
Competitors at the 2019 Southeast Asian Games
Female skateboarders
Filipino skateboarders
Filipino LGBT sportspeople
LGBT skateboarders
Medalists at the 2018 Asian Games
Olympic skateboarders of the Philippines
People from Cebu City
People from Cebu
Skateboarders at the 2018 Asian Games
Skateboarders at the 2020 Summer Olympics
Southeast Asian Games gold medalists for the Philippines
Southeast Asian Games medalists in skateboarding
Sportspeople from Cebu City
Visayan people
X Games athletes
21st-century Filipino women